N-Desalkylflurazepam (also known as norflurazepam) is a benzodiazepine analog and an active metabolite of several other benzodiazepine drugs including flurazepam, flutoprazepam, fludiazepam, midazolam, flutazolam, quazepam, and ethyl loflazepate.  It is long-acting, prone to accumulation, and binds unselectively to the various benzodiazepine receptor subtypes.  It has been sold as a designer drug from 2016 onward.

References 

Benzodiazepines
GABAA receptor positive allosteric modulators
Human drug metabolites